Events from the year 1598 in the Kingdom of Scotland.

Incumbents
Monarch – James VI

Events
 5 August – Battle of Traigh Ghruinneart on Islay: the Clan Donald defeats the Clan Maclean, Sir Lachlan Mor Maclean being killed.
 28 December – Issue in Edinburgh by William Schaw, Master of Work to the Crown of Scotland and General Warden of the master stonemasons, of the First Schaw Statutes, "The Statutis and ordinananceis to be obseruit by all the maister maoissounis within this realme", significant in the development of freemasonry.
Gentleman Adventurers of Fife awarded forfeited lands on the Isle of Lewis to colonise.
Raids on Stornoway.
Publication of
 James VI's The Trew Law of Free Monarchies.
 Robert Greene's play The Scottish History of James IV (posthumously).

Births
Elizabeth Bourchier, later Elizabeth Cromwell, Lady Protectress of England, Scotland and Ireland (died 1665 in England)
John Campbell, 1st Earl of Loudoun, politician and Covenanter (died 1662)
James Lumsden, soldier (died 1660)
 7 December – Gian Lorenzo Bernini, Italian architect and sculptor (died 1680)
 24 December – Margaret Stuart, royal princess (died 1600)
Approximate date – John Hepburn, soldier of fortune (killed at siege of Saverne 1636)

Deaths
 August – Alexander Montgomerie, makar and outlaw (born c.1550?)
 13 August – David Ferguson, reformer
 3 September – John Lindsay of Balcarres, Lord Menmuir, Secretary of State (born 1552)
Mary Beaton, noblewoman (born 1543)

See also
 Timeline of Scottish history

References